Neolithodes brodiei is a species of king crab which is native to New Zealand and its adjacent waters. It has a deep-red colour, and its carapace has many small spinules along with larger spines. It is classified as "Not Threatened" by the New Zealand Department of Conservation.

Misidentifications 
In 2001, a paper was published in Zoosystema which claimed to have found a specimen of N. brodiei in Vanuatu; however, this was later determined to be a yet-undescribed species. Likewise, a 2005 paper in Polar Biology claimed to have found four specimens off the Balleny Islands in the Southern Ocean, but these were misidentified and were later determined to be a new species called Neolithodes yaldwyni.

Etymology 
"Neolithodes" is derived from Greek and Latin and means "new stone-crab", while "brodiei" takes its namesake from J. W. Brodie, then-Director of the New Zealand Oceanographic Institute.

See also 
 List of crabs of New Zealand

References

External links 
 
 

King crabs
Crustaceans described in 1970
Marine crustaceans of New Zealand
Crustaceans of the Pacific Ocean